A clitoris piercing is a genital piercing placed directly through the head (glans) of the clitoris itself. It is a relatively uncommon piercing by choice because of the potential for nerve damage, and because women may find it too stimulating to allow the constant wearing of a small ring or barbell. It is often confused with the more common clitoral hood piercing, which pierces only the hood covering the clitoral glans, allowing the jewellery to make only occasional contact with the most sensitive area.

General
Depending on the anatomy of the individual, a clitoris piercing can be oriented either vertically or horizontally. The clitoris is endowed with a very high concentration of nerve endings and like male genital piercings which penetrate the glans penis, clitoral piercings can be extremely sexually stimulating when subjected to gentle manipulation, or vibration, hence their popularity in certain S & M cultures, where small heavy ornaments are often fitted to increase the sensation.

Piercer Elayne Angel stated that of the "very small number of women who genuinely desire a clitoris piercing (rather than the more common clitoral hood piercing), 90 to 95 percent are not suitably built to accommodate jewelry through the clitoral head." The piercee must have a large enough clitoris to prevent migration of the piercing and subsequent loss because a slightly thicker gauge of jewellery is usually used to prevent the 'cheese-cutter' effect if it becomes caught on clothing, or is pulled too hard during sexual activity.

History and culture 
This piercing is of contemporary origin and is uncommon. In 1989, piercer Jim Ward, interviewed by Andrea Juno in Modern Primitives, stated "I've been in the business for over 10 years and I haven't done more than half a dozen clit piercings."

Jewelry 
Both captive bead rings and barbell style jewelry can be worn in this piercing, both as initial jewelry and in the long term.

Gallery

References

Further reading 
Modern Primitives. V. Vale, 1989. Re/Search Publications. 

Female genital piercings
Piercing